Jacob Weisberg (born 1964) is an American political journalist, who served as editor-in-chief of The Slate Group, a division of Graham Holdings Company. In September 2018, he left Slate to co-found Pushkin Industries, an audio content company, with Malcolm Gladwell. Weisberg was also a Newsweek columnist. He served as the editor of Slate magazine for six years before stepping down in June 2008. He is the son of Lois Weisberg, a Chicago social activist and municipal commissioner.

Background 
Weisberg's father, Bernard Weisberg, was a Chicago lawyer and judge. His parents were introduced at a cocktail party by novelist Ralph Ellison. His mother is Lois Weisberg. His brother is former CIA officer and television writer and producer Joe Weisberg.

Weisberg graduated from Yale University in 1986, where he worked for the Yale Daily News. When a junior, he was offered membership in Skull and Bones by then lieutenant governor of Massachusetts John Kerry. But he declined the offer, citing the club's exclusion of women.

Weisberg was persuaded by The Washington Post'''s Robert G. Kaiser to join Elihu Society. After Yale he attended New College, Oxford on a Rhodes Scholarship.

Career
Weisberg is currently the CEO of Pushkin Industries, a media company focused on audio content, which he co-founded with Malcolm Gladwell. Pushkin focuses on creating new podcasts, audiobooks and short-form audio content. The company produces the podcast Revisionist History, hosted by Gladwell, which was previously produced through Panoply Media, a division of Slate Group. Until September 2018, Weisberg was the Editor in Chief of Slate Group.

Previously, he was a commentator on National Public Radio. He also worked for The New Republic in Washington, D.C., and was a contributing writer for The New York Times Magazine and a contributing editor to Vanity Fair. He has served as a columnist for the Financial Times. Early in his career, he worked for Newsweek in the London and Washington bureaus. Weisberg has also worked as a freelance journalist for numerous publications.

Books
The creator and author of the Bushisms series, Weisberg published The Bush Tragedy in 2008. He is also the author, with former Goldman Sachs executive and Secretary of the Treasury Robert Rubin, of the latter's memoir, In an Uncertain World: Tough Choices from Wall Street to Washington, which was a New York Times bestseller as well as one of Business Weeks ten best business books of 2003.

Weisberg's first book, In Defense of Government, was published in 1996.

He chaired the judging panel for the 2009 BBC Samuel Johnson Prize for excellence in non-fiction writing.

Personal
Weisberg is married to style and fashion journalist Deborah Needleman, formerly editor-in-chief of T:The New York Times Style Magazine editor of domino magazine.

 Works What Are Impeachable Offenses?'' September 28, 2017 issue of New York Review Books, with Noah Feldman

References

External links
 Short bio of Weisberg – Harvard University, Kennedy School of Government
 Video (and audio) debate/conversation with Jacob Weisberg and David Frum on Bloggingheads.tv

1964 births
Living people
American male journalists
Jewish American writers
Jewish American journalists
Yale University alumni
American Rhodes Scholars
Alumni of New College, Oxford
The New Republic people
Slate (magazine) people
Date of birth missing (living people)
Place of birth missing (living people)
American podcasters
21st-century American Jews